John Michael Higgins (born February 12, 1963) is an American actor and comedian whose film credits include Christopher Guest's mockumentaries, the role of David Letterman in HBO's The Late Shift, and a starring role in the American version of Kath & Kim. He portrayed Peter Lovett in the TV Land original sitcom Happily Divorced and provided the voice of Iknik Blackstone Varrick in The Legend of Korra and Mini-Max in Big Hero 6: The Series. He also starred in the NBC sitcom Great News as Chuck Pierce for two seasons. Since 2018, he has hosted the game show America Says, which earned him a 2019 Daytime Emmy Award nomination for Outstanding Game Show Host, though he lost to Alex Trebek.

Career
In the early 1980s Higgins was a theatre instructor with Street 70, a theatre production company in Rockville, MD. It is now known as Round House Theatre. He also taught voice and improvisation. In 1991, Higgins was featured in Broadway's La Bête, and in 2000 he was seen Off-Broadway at Second Stage Theatre in a production of Edward Albee's Tiny Alice. He also originated the title role in Paul Rudnick's Jeffrey Off-Broadway in 1993.

Higgins's numerous television credits include recurring characters on Ally McBeal, Brother's Keeper, Boston Legal and Honey, I Shrunk the Kids: The TV Show. In Season 8 of Seinfeld, he portrayed Elaine's boyfriend Kurt. He also played attorney Wayne Jarvis in five episodes of Arrested Development. Higgins arranged the dense vocal harmonies sung by the nine-part ("neuftet") New Main Street Singers in 2003's A Mighty Wind, a change from the writers' original concept of having the group sing in unison, leveraged by Higgins' musical talent.

Higgins gained more recognition by being featured in the films Fun with Dick and Jane, Pitch Perfect and its sequels, and The Break-Up, for which he also wrote vocal arrangements. His work as a voice actor includes the roles of Judge Mentok in Harvey Birdman, Attorney at Law, 2401 Penitent Tangent in Halo 2, and Riddler in Batman: The Brave and the Bold. Higgins also portrayed David Letterman in the HBO TV film The Late Shift. Higgins was seen in the pre-show video for the Epcot attraction Test Track. However, the ride was refurbished in 2012 and the pre-show room was removed.

Higgins directs and appears on the stage from time to time as well. In 2004, he played Secretary of Defense Donald Rumsfeld in the American premiere of David Hare's Stuff Happens at the Mark Taper Forum in Los Angeles. In 2003, he played the title role in A. R. Gurney's Big Bill at New York's Lincoln Center Theater.

Higgins has been featured in TV ads for DirecTV, alongside fellow co-stars Christopher Guest and Ed Begley Jr., and for Old Navy. He also stars in season 2 of TNT's Raising the Bar as an openly gay, rule-obsessed judge. Higgins took part in The Suite Life on Deck, taking the role of the sinister and secluded Mr. Tipton.

In 2011, Higgins was cast in Happily Divorced opposite Fran Drescher. He played Fran's gay ex-husband, Peter Lovett, a character based on Drescher's real-life ex-husband Peter Marc Jacobson.

In 2012, Higgins was cast as the voice of vain and eccentric businessman Iknik Blackstone Varrick in The Legend of Korra.

From 2017 to 2018, Higgins starred as Chuck Pierce on the NBC comedy series Great News.

Higgins became the host of the game show America Says in 2018. Coincidentally, he played a game show host 14 years earlier in a season 3 episode of the TV comedy/drama detective series Monk.

Since 2019, Higgins has appeared in TV commercials for Omaha-based Physicians Mutual Insurance Company.  In 2020, Higgins began appearing in a series of adverts for 123.ie, an Irish insurance company.

Higgins played the role of Principal Toddman in the 2020 Peacock comedy series Saved by the Bell, which was created by Tracey Wigfield.

Filmography

Film

Television

Video games

Theme park attractions

References

External links
 
 P., Ken (April 12, 2002). "10 Questions: John Michael Higgins". IGN.

1963 births
American male comedians
American male film actors
American male voice actors
Living people
Male actors from Boston
20th-century American male actors
21st-century American male actors
American male television actors
American game show hosts
20th-century American comedians
21st-century American comedians